Gong'an County is a county in southern Hubei province, People's Republic of China, bordering Hunan to the south. It is under the administration of Jingzhou City.

History
During the Han dynasty and the Three Kingdoms era, Gong'an County was known as Youjiangkou and was a part of Jingzhou Province. It was a camp for Liu Bei's forces during the Sun–Liu territorial dispute.

In April 2009, the county drew nationwide ridicule after media reported that Gong'an officials had ordered civil servants and employees of state-owned companies to buy a total of 23,000 packs / year of a Hubei brand of cigarette. Departments whose employees failed to buy enough or who bought other brands would be fined. The officials were undaunted, saying that the increased revenue from the cigarette tax would buoy the local economy. After several weeks of embarrassment, they relented, posting a short message on their government Web site: "We have decided to remove this edict."

Administrative divisions
The county oversees 14 towns and two townships as of 2016. Altogether 59 neighbourhood committees, 321 village committees and 3,337 village groups come under the county's jurisdiction.
The new county seat for executive, legislative and judiciary and for the CPC and PSB branches, is Douhudi.

Fourteen towns:
　Buhe (pop. 100,552)
　Douhudi (pop. 131,865)
　Yangjiachang (pop. 54,402)
　Mahaokou　(pop. 63,032)
　Jiazhuyuan　(pop. 56,178)
　Zhakou　(pop. 56,754)
　Ouchi　(pop. 46,623)
　Huangshantou　(pop. 38,388)
　Zhangzhuangpu　(pop. 66,622)
　Shizikou (pop. 67,228)
　Banzhudang (pop. 74,099)
　Mengjiaxi (pop. 49,261)
　Nanping (pop. 56,505)
　Maojiagang (pop. 76,440)

Two townships:
　Ganjiachang Township (pop. 42,591)
　Zhangtiansi Township (pop. 46,355)

Climate

Notes and references

External links
Gong'an County Government 

Counties of Hubei
Jingzhou